The 2005 CECAFA Cup was the 29th edition of the tournament. It was held in Rwanda, and was won by Ethiopia. The matches were played between November 26 to December 10. All matches were played in Stade Amahoro in Kigali.

Kenya was disqualified for failure to pay fees to CECAFA.

Group stage

Group A

Group B

Knockout stage

Semi-finals

Third place match

Final

References
RSSSF archives

CECAFA Cup
International association football competitions hosted by Rwanda
2005 in Rwandan sport